Taste receptor type 2 member 20 is a protein that in humans is encoded by the TAS2R20 gene.

See also
 Taste receptor

References

Further reading

Human taste receptors